Sydney Devine  (11 January 1940 – 13 February 2021) was a Scottish singer. He sold 15 million albums during his career, reached the UK's top 20 albums chart and was part of the White Heather Club troupe.

Life and career
Devine was born in Bellside, a settlement near the village of Cleland, North Lanarkshire, Scotland, in January 1940. He achieved a measure of fame as a boy through an extraordinary ability to reproduce chaffinch noises. He performed his bird whistling set at the Hippodrome in London, and when his voice broke he returned to Scotland and joined the White Heather Club troupe. In the 1970s, he had his own television show on Scottish Television (STV), which made him famous to millions of people the length and breadth of mid-Scotland. He mixed with musical industry figures in Europe and the US and claimed he had once performed in front of Elvis Presley. He had one UK top-20 album. He was sometimes referred to as 'Steak and Kidney'. 

In 2003, Devine became a Member of the Order of the British Empire (MBE) for services to music. 

In September 2017, Devine, at the age of 77, announced a nationwide tour with his daughter,  Debby McGregor, nearly 20 years since his previous tour.

Devine died on 13 February 2021, at the age of 81.

Albums

 Your Favourite Country Songs (Emerald - 1970)
 Country (Emerald - 1973)
 Encores (Emerald - 1974)
 Crying Time (Emerald - 1974)
 The Very Best Of (Emerald - 1975)
 Absolutely Devine (Emerald - 1975)
 Live At The City Hall, Glasgow (Emerald - 1975)
 Live At The City Hall, Glasgow (Pickwick - 1976)
 Doubly Devine (Philips - 1976)
 This Song is Just for You (Sunset - 1976)
 Devine Time (Philips - 1976)
 The Collection (Pickwick 1977)
 Greatest Hits (Emerald 1977)
 Almost Persuaded (Philips - 1977)
 Nashville Album (Philips - 1978)
 My World of Music (Philips - 1979)
 20 Golden Greats (Ronco 1980)
 25th Anniversary Album (Philips 1980)
 The Pride of Bonnie Scotland (Phonodisc 1980)
 Heartaches (Philips 1981)
 Take My Hand, Precious Lord (Emerald)
 Favourite Memories of Mine (Country House) 
 By Request (Country House)
 From Scotland With Love (Scotdisc)
 Hits Jackpot (Country House)
 Always & Forever (Scotdisc)
 Green Green Grass of Home (Scotdisc)
 The Very Best Of (MCA)
 Norfolk Country (Scotdisc)
 Crying Time (Homeland)
 Crying Time (Emporio)
 50 Country Winners (Prism)
 Line Dance Party (Scotdisc)
 Line Dance Party 2 (Scotdisc)
 Crying Time (Prism)
 Simply Devine (Scotdisc)
 Dance Party (Scotdisc)
 Big Country Line Dance Party (Scotdisc)
 40 Greatest Hits (Emerald)
 The Best Of (Music Delta)
 Crying Time (Emerald)
 You Can Dance (with Tommy Scott) (Scotdisc - 2005)
 When I Stop Dreaming (Scotdisc - 2006)
 Line Dance Party (Scotdisc - 2007)
 Skiffle Country (Scotdisc - 2010)
 Tiny Bubbles and the Signature Songs (Scotdisc - 2012)
 Nashville Country (Scotdisc 2014)
 Love Songs (Scotdisc 2015)
 It Is No Secret (Emerald 2015)
 I'm Back (Scotdisc 2019)

References

External links
"Sydney Devine and the jingle that rings a bell with his fans", The Herald; accessed 4 November 2021.
 Simply Devine autobiography
Scotdisc catalogue
 
 
 Profile, 45cat.com; accessed 4 November 2021.

1940 births
2021 deaths
20th-century Scottish male singers
Members of the Order of the British Empire
People from Cleland, North Lanarkshire
Place of death missing
21st-century Scottish male singers